The 2002 Rugby Canada Super League season was the fifth season for the RCSL.

Standings
Western Division
{| class="wikitable" style="text-align: center;"
|-
! width="250"|Team
! width="20"|Pld
! width="20"|W
! width="20"|D
! width="20"|L
! width="20"|F
! width="20"|A
! width="25"|+/-
! width="20"|BP
! width="20"|Pts
|-
|align=left| Vancouver Island Crimson Tide
|5||4||0||1||140||65||+75||1||17
|-
|align=left| Fraser Valley Venom
|5||4||0||1||117||56||+61||0||16
|-
|align=left| Vancouver Wave
|5||3||0||2||121||78||+43||2||14
|-
|align=left| Calgary Mavericks
|5||3||0||2||106||68||+38||0||12
|-
|align=left| Saskatchewan Prairie Fire
|5||1||0||4||79||134||-55||1||5
|-
|align=left| Edmonton Gold
|5||0||0||5||48||210||-162||1||1
|}

Eastern Division
{| class="wikitable" style="text-align: center;"
|-
! width="250"|Team
! width="20"|Pld
! width="20"|W
! width="20"|D
! width="20"|L
! width="20"|F
! width="20"|A
! width="25"|+/-
! width="20"|BP
! width="20"|Pts
|-
|align=left| Newfoundland Rock
|6||6||0||0||159||58||+101||0||24
|-
|align=left| Toronto Renegades
|6||5||0||1||227||58||+169||0||20
|-
|align=left| The Academy (RCSL)
|6||3||0||3||125||106||+19||2||14
|-
|align=left| Ottawa Harlequins
|6||3||0||3||82||176||-94||1||13
|-
|align=left| Nova Scotia Keltics
|6||2||0||4||81||152||-71||1||9
|-
|align=left| Montreal Menace
|6||1||0||5||58||84||-26||4||8
|-
|align=left| New Brunswick Black Spruce
|6||1||0||5||76||174||-98||2||6
|}

Championship final

The Vancouver Island Crimson Tide (Western Division champions) defeated the Newfoundland Rock (Eastern Division Champions) 6-3 in the Championship Final, played in St. John's, Newfoundland on 27 July 2002.

References

Rugby Canada Super League seasons
RCSL
England National Division One